Theodore Seio Chihara (born 1929) is a mathematician working on orthogonal polynomials who introduced Al-Salam–Chihara polynomials, Brenke–Chihara polynomials, and Chihara–Ismail polynomials'''. His brother is composer Paul Chihara.

Publications

References

Living people
20th-century American mathematicians
21st-century American mathematicians
1929 births